

Leżajsk County is a unit of territorial administration and local government (powiat) in Subcarpathian Voivodeship, south-eastern Poland. It came into being on January 1, 1999, as a result of the Polish local government reforms passed in 1998.

As of 2019 its total population is 69,479, of which the population of Leżajsk is 13,853, that of Nowa Sarzyna is 5,834, and the rural population is 49,792.

Neighbouring counties
Leżajsk County is bordered by Biłgoraj County to the north-east, Przeworsk County and Łańcut County to the south, Rzeszów County to the south-west, and Nisko County to the north-west.

Administrative division
The county is subdivided into five gminas (one urban, one urban-rural and three rural). These are listed in the following table, in descending order of population.

Notable residents
Moe Drabowsky, American major league baseball pitcher

References

 
Land counties of Podkarpackie Voivodeship